Montréal-Matin ("Montreal-Morning") was a Quebec daily newspaper based in Montreal. It was published from 1930 to 1978. It was politically associated to the Conservative Party of Quebec and, afterwards, its successor the Union Nationale. It was known as L'Illustration from 1930 to 1936 and L'Illustration Nouvelle from 1936 to 1941.

It was the first French newspaper in Montreal to adopt the tabloid format. In 1964, the arrival on the market of Pierre Péladeau's Le Journal de Montréal, another tabloid similar in its target popular demographic, created a notable competition between the two. The decline of the Union Nationale also brought hardship. Montréal-Matin was sold to La Presse in 1973 and folded in 1978.

Notable staff
 Marcel Desjardins — director of information (1976 to 1979)

See also
List of Quebec historical newspapers
List of Quebec media
Politics of Quebec
List of newspapers in Canada

Sources

References

Newspapers established in 1930
Publications disestablished in 1978
Defunct newspapers published in Quebec
French-language newspapers published in Quebec
Newspapers published in Montreal
Daily newspapers published in Quebec
1930 establishments in Quebec
1978 disestablishments in Quebec